Equine anatomy encompasses the gross and microscopic anatomy of horses, ponies and other equids, including donkeys, mules and zebras. While all anatomical features of equids are described in the same terms as for other animals by the International Committee on Veterinary Gross Anatomical Nomenclature in the book Nomina Anatomica Veterinaria, there are many horse-specific colloquial terms used by equestrians.

External anatomy
 Back: the area where the saddle sits, beginning at the end of the withers, extending to the last thoracic vertebrae (colloquially includes the loin or "coupling," though technically incorrect usage)
 Barrel: the body of the horse, enclosing the rib cage and the major internal organs
 Buttock: the part of the hindquarters behind the thighs and below the root of the tail
 Cannon or cannon bone: the area between the knee or hock and the fetlock joint, sometimes called the "shin" of the horse, though technically it is the third metacarpal
 Chestnut: a callosity on the inside of each leg
 Chin groove: the part of the horse's head behind the lower lip and chin, the area that dips down slightly on the lower jaw; area where the curb chain of certain bits is fastened
 Coupling: see "Loin" below
 Coronet or coronary band: the ring of soft tissue just above the horny hoof that blends into the skin of the leg
 Crest: the upper portion of the neck where the mane grows
 Croup: the topline of the hindquarters, beginning at the hip, extending proximate to the sacral vertebrae and stopping at the dock of the tail (where the coccygeal vertebrae begin); sometimes called "rump"
 Dock: the living part of the tail, consisting of the coccygeal vertebrae, muscles and ligaments.  Sometimes used colloquially to refer to the root of the tail, below.
 Elbow: The joint of the front leg at the point where the belly of the horse meets the leg. Homologous to the elbow in humans
 Ergot:  a callosity on the back of the fetlock
 Face: the area between the forehead and the tip of the upper lip
 Fetlock: sometimes called the "ankle" of the horse, though it is not the same skeletal structure as an ankle in humans; known to anatomists as the metacarpophalangeal (front) or metatarsophalangeal (hind) joint; homologous to the "ball" of the foot or the metacarpophalangeal joints of the fingers in humans
 Flank: where the hind legs and the barrel meet, specifically the area right behind the rib cage and in front of the stifle joint
 Forearm: the area of the front leg between the knee and elbow, consisting of the fused radius and ulna, and all the tissue around these bones; anatomically, the antebrachium.
 Forehead: the area between the poll, the eyes and the arch of the nose
 Forelock: the continuation of the mane, which hangs from between the ears down onto the forehead of the horse
 Frog: the highly elastic wedge-shaped mass on the underside of the hoof, which normally makes contact with the ground every stride, and supports both the locomotion and circulation of the horse
 Gaskin: the large muscle on the hind leg, just above the hock, below the stifle, homologous to the calf of a human
 Girth or heartgirth: the area right behind the elbow of the horse, where the girth of the saddle would go; this area should be where the barrel is at its greatest diameter in a properly-conditioned horse that is not pregnant or obese
 Hindquarters: the large, muscular area of the hind legs, above the stifle and behind the barrel.  Can also be used to refer to the back end of a horse.
 Hock: the tarsus of the horse (hindlimb equivalent to the human ankle and heel), the large joint on the hind leg
 Hoof: the foot of the horse; the hoof wall is the tough outside covering of the hoof that comes into contact with the ground and is, in many respects, a much larger and stronger version of the human fingernail
 Jugular groove: the line of indentation on the lower portion of the neck, can be seen from either side, just above the windpipe; beneath this area run the jugular vein, the carotid artery and part of the sympathetic trunk
 Knee: the carpus of the horse (equivalent to the human wrist), the large joint in the front legs, above the cannon bone
 Loin: the area right behind the saddle, going from the last rib to the croup, anatomically approximate to the lumbar spine
 Mane: long and relatively coarse hair growing from the dorsal ridge of the neck
 Muzzle: the chin, mouth, and nostrils of the face
 Pastern: the connection between the coronet and the fetlock, made up of the middle and proximal phalanx
 Poll: commonly refers to the poll joint at the beginning of the neck, immediately behind the ears, a slight depression at the joint where the atlas (C1) meets the occipital crest; anatomically, the occipital crest itself is the "poll"
 Root of the tail or root of the dock: the point where the tail is "set on" (attached) to the rump; Sometimes also called the "dock"
 Shoulder: made up of the scapula and associated muscles, runs from the withers to the point of shoulder (the joint at the front of the chest, i.e. the glenoid); the angle of the shoulder has a great effect on the horse's movement and jumping ability, and is an important aspect of equine conformation
 Splints: bones found on each of the legs, on either side of the cannon bone (8 total); partially vestigial, these bones support the corresponding carpal bones in the forelimb, and the corresponding tarsal bones in the hindlimb; anatomically referred to as Metacarpal/Metatarsal II (on the medial aspect (inside)) and IV (on the lateral aspect (outside))
 Stifle joint: corresponds to the knee of a human, consists of the articulation between femur and tibia, as well as the articulation between patella and femur
 Tail: the long hairs which grow from the dock; may also include the dock
 Throatlatch (also, throttle, throatlash, throat): the point at which the windpipe meets the head at the underside of the jaw, corresponding to where the eponymous part of a bridle goes.
 Withers: the highest point of the thoracic vertebrae, the point just above the tops of the shoulder blades, seen best with horse standing square and head slightly lowered; the height of the horse is measured at the withers.

Digestive system

Horses and other equids evolved as grazing animals, adapted to eating small amounts of the same kind of food all day long. In the wild, the horse adapted to eating prairie grasses in semi-arid regions and traveling significant distances each day in order to obtain adequate nutrition.

Mouth

Digestion begins in the mouth, which is also called the "oral cavity." It is made up of the teeth, the hard palate, the soft palate, the tongue and related muscles, the cheeks and the lips. Horses also have three pairs of salivary glands, the parotoid (largest salivary gland and located near the poll), mandibular (located in the jaw), and sublingual (located under the tongue).  Horses select pieces of forage and pick up finer foods, such as grain, with their sensitive, prehensile lips. The front teeth of the horse, called incisors, clip forage, and food is then pushed back in the mouth by the tongue, and ground up for swallowing by the premolars and molars.

Esophagus
A muscular ring, called the cardiac sphincter, connects the stomach to the esophagus. This sphincter is very well developed in horses. This and the oblique angle at which the esophagus connects to the stomach explains why horses cannot vomit. The esophagus is also the area of the digestive tract where horses may suffer from choke.

Stomach

Horses have a relatively small stomach for their size, and this limits the amount of feed a horse can take in at one time. Because the stomach empties when  full, whether stomach enzymes have completed their processing of the food or not, and doing so prevents full digestion and proper utilization of feed, continuous foraging or several small feedings per day are preferable to one or two large ones. The horse stomach consists of a non-glandular proximal region (saccus cecus), divided by a distinct border, the margo plicatus, from the glandular distal stomach.

In the stomach, assorted acids and the enzyme pepsin break down food. Pepsin allows for the further breakdown of proteins into amino acid chains. Other enzymes include resin and lipase. Additionally, the stomach absorbs some water, as well as ions and lipid-soluble compounds.

Small intestine
This is the major digestive organ, and where most nutrients are absorbed. It has three parts, the duodenum, jejunum and ileum. The majority of digestion occurs in the duodenum while the majority of absorption occurs in the jejunum. Bile from the liver aids in digesting fats in the duodenum combined with enzymes from the pancreas and small intestine. Horses, in common with mammals such as camels, do not have a gall bladder, meaning bile flows constantly. Most food is digested and absorbed into the bloodstream from the small intestine, including proteins, simple carbohydrate, fats, and vitamins A, D, . Any remaining liquids and roughage move into the large intestine.

Large intestine

Cecum
The cecum is the first section of the large intestine. It is also known as the "water gut" or "hind gut". It contains bacteria that digest cellulose plant fiber through fermentation. These bacteria feed upon chyme digestive, and also produce certain fat-soluble vitamins which are absorbed by the horse. The reason horses must have their diets changed slowly is so the bacteria in the cecum are able to modify and adapt to the different chemical structure of new feedstuffs. Too abrupt a change in diet can cause colic, as the new food is not properly digested.

Other section of the large intestine
The large colon, small colon, and rectum make up the remainder of the large intestine. It is made up of the right ventral (lower) colon, the left ventral colon, the left dorsal (upper) colon, the right dorsal colon, and the transverse colon, in that order. Three flexures are also named; the sternal flexure, between right and left ventral colon; the pelvic flexure, between left ventral and left dorsal colon; the diaphragmatic flexure, between left dorsal and right dorsal colon. The main purpose of the large colon is to absorb carbohydrates, which were broken down from cellulose in the cecum. Due to its many twists and turns, it is a common place for a type of horse colic called an impaction.

It is the area where the majority of water in the horse's diet is absorbed, and is the place where fecal lumps are formed.

Reproductive system

Mare

The mare's reproductive system is responsible for controlling gestation, birth, and lactation, as well as her estrous cycle and mating behavior. It lies ventral to the 4th or 5th lumbar vertebrae, although its position within the mare can vary depending on the movement of the intestines and distention of the bladder.

In equine ovaries, unlike in humans, the vascular tissue is cortical to follicular tissue, so ovulation can only occur at an ovulation fossa near the infundibulum. The ovaries connect to the fallopian tubes (oviducts), which serve to move the ovum from the ovary to the uterus. To do so, the oviducts are lined with a layer of cilia, which produce a current that flows toward the uterus. These horns attach to the body of the uterus ( long). The equine uterus is bipartite, meaning the two uterine horns fuse into a relatively large uterine body (resembling a shortened bicornuate uterus or a stretched simplex uterus). Usually  in diameter with longitudinal folds on the interior surface, it can expand to allow the passage of the foal. The vulva is the external opening of the vagina, and consists of the clitoris and two labia. It lies ventral to the rectum. The mare has two mammary glands, which are smaller in maiden mares. They have two ducts each, which open externally.

Stallion

The stallion's reproductive system is responsible for his sexual behavior and secondary sex characteristics (such as a large crest). The internal genitalia accessory sex glands are the vesicular glands, prostate gland, and bulbourethral glands, which contribute fluid to the semen at ejaculation, but are not strictly necessary for fertility.

Teeth

A horse's teeth include incisors, premolars, molars, and sometimes canine teeth. A horse's incisors, premolars, and molars, once fully developed, continue to erupt throughout its lifetime as the grinding surface is worn down through chewing. Because of this pattern of wear, a rough estimate of a horse's age can be made from an examination of the teeth. Abnormal wear of the teeth, caused by conformational defects, abnormal behaviors, or improper diets, can cause serious health issues and can even result in the death of the horse.

Feet/hooves

The hoof of the horse encases the second and third phalanx of the lower limbs, analogous to the fingertip or toe tip of a human.  In essence, a horse travels on its "tiptoes".  The hoof wall is a much larger, thicker and stronger version of the human fingernail or toenail, made up of similar materials, primarily keratin, a very strong protein molecule. The horse's hoof contains a high proportion of sulfur-containing amino acids which contribute to its resilience and toughness. Vascular fold-like structures called laminae suspend the distal phalanx from the hoof wall.

Skeletal system

The skeleton of the horse has three major functions in the body. It protects vital organs, provides framework, and supports soft parts of the body. Horses have , which are divided into the appendicular skeleton (the legs) and the axial skeleton (the skull, vertebral column, sternum, and ribs). Bones are connected to muscles via tendons and other bones via ligaments. Bones are also used to store minerals, and are the site of red blood cell formation.
 The Appendicular system includes the limbs of the horse;
 The Axial system is composed of the spine, ribs and skull;
The bones of the horse are the same as those of other domestic species, but the third metacarpal and metatarsal are much more developed and the second and fourth are undeveloped, having the first and fifth metacarpal and metatarsal.

Ligaments and tendons

Ligaments

Ligaments attach bone to bone or bone to tendon, and are vital in stabilizing joints as well as supporting structures. They are made up of fibrous material that is generally quite strong. Due to their relatively poor blood supply, ligament injuries generally take a long time to heal.

Tendons

Tendons are cords of connective tissue attaching muscle to bone, cartilage or other tendons. They are a major contributor to shock absorption, are necessary for support of the horse's body, and translate the force generated by muscles into movement. Tendons are classified as flexors (flex a joint) or extensors (extend a joint). However, some tendons will flex multiple joints while extending another (the flexor tendons of the hind limb, for example, will flex the fetlock, pastern, and coffin joint, but extend the hock joint). In this case, the tendons (and associated muscles) are named for their most distal action (digital flexion).

Tendons form in the embryo from fibroblasts which become more tightly packed as the tendon grows. As tendons develop they lay down collagen, which is the main structural protein of connective tissue. As tendons pass near bony prominences, they are protected by a fluid filled synovial structure, either a tendon sheath or a sac called a bursa.

Tendons are easily damaged if placed under too much strain, which can result in a painful, and possibly career-ending, injury. Tendinitis is most commonly seen in high performance horses that gallop or jump. When a tendon is damaged the healing process is slow because tendons have a poor blood supply, reducing the availability of nutrients and oxygen to the tendon. Once a tendon is damaged the tendon will always be weaker, because the collagen fibres tend to line up in random arrangements instead of the stronger linear pattern.  Scar tissue within the tendon decreases the overall elasticity in the damaged section of the tendon as well, causing an increase in strain on adjacent uninjured tissue.

Muscular system

When a muscle contracts, it pulls a tendon, which acts on the horse's bones to move them. Muscles are commonly arranged in pairs so that they oppose each other (they are "antagonists"), with one flexing the joint (a flexor muscle) and the other extending it (extensor muscle). Therefore, one muscle of the pair must be relaxed in order for the other muscle in the pair to contract and bend the joint properly. A muscle is made up of several muscle bundles, which in turn are made up of muscle fibers. Muscle fibers have myofibrils, which are able to contract due to actin and myosin. A muscle together with its tendon and bony attachments form an extensor or flexor unit.

Respiratory system and smell

The horse's respiratory system consists of the nostrils, pharynx, larynx, trachea, diaphragm, and lungs. Additionally, the nasolacrimal duct and sinuses are connected to the nasal passage. The horse's respiratory system not only allows the animal to breathe, but also is important in the horse's sense of smell (olfactory ability) as well as in communicating.  The soft palate blocks off the pharynx from the mouth (oral cavity) of the horse, except when swallowing. This helps prevent the horse from inhaling food, but also means that a horse cannot use its mouth to breathe when in respiratory distress—a horse can only breathe through its nostrils, also called obligate nasal breathing.  For this same reason, horses also cannot pant as a method of thermoregulation.  The genus Equus also has a unique part of the respiratory system called the guttural pouch, which is thought to equalize air pressure on the tympanic membrane. Located between the mandibles but below the occiput, it fills with air when the horse swallows or exhales.

Circulatory system

The horse's circulatory system includes the four-chambered heart, averaging  in weight, as well as the blood and blood vessels. Its main purpose is to circulate blood throughout the body to deliver oxygen and nutrients to tissues, and to remove waste from these tissues. The hoof (including the frog - the V shaped part on the bottom of the horses hoof) is a very important part of the circulatory system. As the horse puts weight onto the hoof, the hoof wall is pushed outwards and the frog compressed, driving blood out of the frog, the digital pad, and the laminae of the hoof.  When weight is removed from the hoof, the release of pressure pulls blood back down into the foot again.  This effectively creates an auxiliary blood-pumping system at the end of each leg.  Some of this effect may be lost when a horse is shod (eliminating the expansion and contraction of the hoof wall and raising the frog higher from the ground).

The eye

The horse has one of the largest eyes of all land mammals. Eye size in mammals is significantly correlated to maximum running speed as well as to body size, in accordance with Leuckart's law; animals capable of fast locomotion require large eyes. The eye of the horse is set to the side of its skull, consistent with that of a prey animal. The horse has a wide field of monocular vision, as well as good visual acuity.  Horses have two-color, or dichromatic vision, which is somewhat like red-green color blindness  in humans. Because the horse's vision is closely tied to behavior, the horse's visual abilities are often taken into account when handling and training the animal.

Hearing

The hearing of horses is good, superior to that of humans, and the pinna of each ear can rotate up to 180°, giving the potential for 360° hearing without having to move the head.  Often, the eye of the horse is looking in the same direction as the ear is directed.

See also
 Equine conformation
 Glossary of equestrian terms
 Ergot (horse anatomy)
 Chestnut (horse anatomy)
 Limbs of the horse

References

External links
 Veterinary Anatomical lllustrations, University of Wisconsin Digital Collections